Gonerilia seraphim is a butterfly in the family Lycaenidae.

Subspecies
G. s. seraphim
G. s. kimurai Koiwaya, 1996
G. s. mekong Yoshino, 1999

References

Butterflies described in 1886
Theclini
Taxa named by Charles Oberthür